Jaime Álvarez Cisneros (born 26 September 1974) is a Mexican politician from the Citizens' Movement. From 2009 to 2012 he served as Deputy of the LXI Legislature of the Mexican Congress representing Morelos.

References

1974 births
Living people
Politicians from Morelos
Citizens' Movement (Mexico) politicians
21st-century Mexican politicians
Members of the Congress of Morelos
Deputies of the LXI Legislature of Mexico
Members of the Chamber of Deputies (Mexico) for Morelos